In the Heat of the Night is the second solo studio album by jazz keyboardist Jeff Lorber.

The album peaked at No. 7 on the Traditional Jazz Albums chart and No. 44 on the Top Black Albums chart.

Its artwork consists of a still image from a 1982 commercial promoting the acquisition of American electronic brand Quasar from Motorola to Matsushita Electric Industrial, which is now Panasonic.

Track listing

Personnel 
 Jeff Lorber – keyboards, guitars (1, 6, 9), drum programming (1, 9), lead vocals (1), backing vocals (1, 9), guitar solo (5), arrangements (8)
 Maurice Starr – keyboards (1, 9), guitars (1, 9), drum programming (1, 9), lead vocals (1), backing vocals (1, 9)
 Marlon McClain – guitars (2-8, 10), guitar solo (5)
 Lee Ritenour – rhythm guitar (5)
 Nathan East – bass (2-8, 10), vocals (2)
 John Robinson – cymbals (1, 9), drums (2-8, 10)
 Jimmy Johnson – congas (1, 9)
 Paulinho da Costa – percussion (2-8, 10)
 Ronnie Laws – saxophone solo (3)
 Phillip Ingram – lead vocals (3)
 Steve George – backing vocals (2-8, 10)
 David Page – backing vocals (2-8, 10)
 Richard Page – backing vocals (2-8, 10)
 Alex Ligertwood – lead vocals (8)

Production 
 Robert Abel – executive producer 
 Maurice Starr – producer (1, 9)
 Jeff Lorber – producer (2-8, 10) 
 Phil Greene – recording (1, 9), mixing (1, 9)
 Chris Brunt – recording (2-8, 10), mixing (2-8, 10)
 Joe Moody – second engineer (1, 9)
 Ben Ing – second engineer (2-8, 10)
 Ria Lewerke – art direction 
 Randy Roberts – creative director, design 
 Aaron Rapoport – back cover photography

Studios
 Tracks 1 & 9 recorded at Syncrosound (Boston, Massachusetts).
 Tracks 2-8 & 10 recorded at Indigo Ranch Studios (Malibu, California).
 Mixed at Normandy Sound (Warren, Rhode Island).

Charts

References

External links
In the Heat of the Night at discogs: link
In the Heat of the Night at Lorber's website: link

1984 albums
Jeff Lorber albums
Albums produced by Maurice Starr
Arista Records albums